Pepper and Red Pepper (Spanish: Pimienta y pimentón) is a 1970 Argentine film featuring Luis Sandrini and José Marrone.

References

External links
 

1970 films
Argentine comedy films
1970s Spanish-language films
Films directed by Carlos Rinaldi
1970s Argentine films